Oleg Anatolevitch Ryakhovskiy (born 19 October 1933) is a Russian former Soviet triple jumper. He is a former world record holder, the 1958 silver medallist at the European Athletics Championships, and twice Soviet national champion.

The latter mark was achieved at the Soviet Athletics Championships, where he put an end to Leonid Shcherbakov long-running streak to win his first national title.

The peak of Ryakhovskiy's career came in 1958. Ryakhovskiy's record stood for less than a year, as it was improved by fellow Soviet Oleg Fedoseyev the following May. Ryakhovskiy was selected for the Soviet team for the 1958 European Athletics Championships. Despite clearing sixteen metres at the competition (which no athlete had done previously) he was outperformed by Poland's Józef Szmidt and settled for European silver. He closed the season with a second straight national title at the Soviet Championships.

He had an unusual technique for the time, which relied less on lift in the jump stage and more on raw speed (he had a best of 10.6 seconds for the 100 metres). He remained high in the world rankings in the 1959, ranking fifth after clearing  – the second best mark of his career, though this left him in second place behind Fedoseyev at the Spartakiade. A leg injury hampered his 1960 season; he was third nationally and dropped out of the global top ten performers. He ranked fifth in the world in 1961, but ceased to compete at a high level thereafter. He lost his state sports scholarship and instead opted for a purely academic one.

Ryakhovskiy was highly successful as a student-athlete during the period from 1957 to 1961. He won a gold medal at the 1957 World University Games in a games record  – as the last winner of the competition, this record stands permanently. He followed this with two gold medals in 1959, winning at the World Festival of Youth and Students and then defeating Japanese Koji Sakurai and Hiroshi Shibata to claim the first ever men's triple jump title at the Universiade. He attempted to defend his Universiade title two years later, but was narrowly beaten by Romania's Sorin Ioan.

Ryakhovskiy studied sports science up to doctorate level at Moscow State Technical University and later became a professor there. Studying the mechanics of athletics, he served on the Technical Committee for the International Association of Athletics Federations for twelve years. Among his recommendations for the sport is a new method of recording false starts in sprint races. Ryakhovskiy argues that the current approach (measurement of pressure upon the starting blocks) unfairly impedes athletes who are stronger, heavier, or favour a starting technique with more backwards leg pressure. He has suggested using a light beam to measure movement of athlete's hands from the starting line, which is the first body part to move and can be measured equally across all athletes.

International competitions

National titles
Soviet Athletics Championships
Triple jump: 1958, 1959

See also
List of European Athletics Championships medalists (men)

References



Living people
1933 births
Sportspeople from Tashkent
Soviet male triple jumpers
Uzbekistani male triple jumpers
Russian male triple jumpers
World record setters in athletics (track and field)
Universiade medalists in athletics (track and field)
Sports scientists
Russian professors
Academic staff of Bauman Moscow State Technical University
Bauman Moscow State Technical University alumni
Universiade gold medalists for the Soviet Union
Universiade silver medalists for the Soviet Union
Medalists at the 1959 Summer Universiade
Medalists at the 1961 Summer Universiade